The college football recruiting class of 2022 refers to the recruiting of high school athletes to play college football starting in the fall of 2022. The scope of this article covers: (a) the colleges and universities with recruiting classes ranking among the top 20 in the country as assessed by at least one of the major media outlets, and (b) the individual recruits ranking among the top 20 in the country as assessed by at least one of the major media outlets.

The Texas A&M Aggies, led by head coach Jimbo Fisher, had the top recruiting class, being ranked No. 1 by 247Sports, Rivals.com, and On3. Six Texas A&M recruits were rated in the top 10 by one or more of the rating agencies. Texas A&M's 2022 class is rated as the best in the history of recruiting rankings.

Alabama, Georgia, Ohio State, and Texas were ranked second through fifth by all three raters.

Defensive tackle Walter Nolen and cornerback Travis Hunter were the top two recruits, as rated by ESPN.com, 247Sports, Rivals.com, and USA Today.

Top ranked classes

Top ranked recruits
The following individuals were rated by one of the major media outlets among the top  20 players in the country in the Class of 2022. They are listed in order of their highest ranking by any of the major media outlets.

References

Recruiting class
Recruiting class